Neukirchen-Vluyn is a town in the district of Wesel, in North Rhine-Westphalia, Germany. It is situated approximately 5 km west of Moers, and 15 km north of Krefeld.

Mayors
Mayors since 1836:
 1836–1875 Gustav Haarbeck
 1875–1923 Hermann Haarbeck
 1923–1928 Dr. Baehr
 1928–1945 Erich Neumann (NSDAP)
 1945–1946 Wilhelm Schneider (appointed by military government)
 1946–1950 Tillmann Bongardt (CDU)
 1950–1952 Oskar Kühnel (SPD)
 1952–1956 Johann Kaiser (SPD)
 1956–1963 Oskar Kühnel (SPD)
 1963–1975 Gerhard Haastert (CDU)
 1975–1989 Oskar Böhm (SPD)
 1989–1994 Kornelia Kuhn (CDU)
 1994–1999 Peter Wermke (SPD) (last voluntary Mayor)
 1999–2009 Bernd Böing (parteilos) (first full-time Mayor)
 2009–2020 Harald Lenßen (CDU)
 since 2020 Ralf Köpke (SPD)

Population development
Number of inhabitants as of December, 31

Economy
The Trox Group has its headquarters in Neukirchen-Vluyn. There are other large businesses in town: Arinox, MEDA, Pionier Absaugtechnik, Schwing Technologies, LED Linear, Ornua.

Sights
Mills, typically to those found in the Netherlands, from the 18th and 19th century, colonies of cole minings as well as the water castle Bloemersheim are witnesses of Neukirchen-Vluyn's history. Historical city tours and the local museum display the influence of agriculture and mining on the development of the town. The museum is located in the cultural hall "Kulturhalle", where one can enjoy exhibitions of art and live music on a regular basis. The classical concerts in the courtyard of the castle are further a constant in Neukirchen-Vluyn's entertainment schedule. For recreation, the town offers various trails for horseback riding and hiking as well as a golf court.

Twin towns – sister cities

Neukirchen-Vluyn is twinned with:
 Buckingham, England, United Kingdom
 Mouvaux, France
 Ustroń, Poland

Notable people
Karl-Heinz Florenz (born 1947), politician (CDU), since 1989 member of the European Parliament
Christopher Lutz (born 1971), chess grandmaster
Kostas Mitroglou (born 1988), Greek footballer; grew up here

References

External links
 

Wesel (district)